Topik Petang is an Indonesian television news program, which was broadcast Monday to Friday at 18:30, Saturday and Sunday at 17:30, on antv. It debuted on April 30, 2006. The program was broadcast at different times on antv if the broadcast of a sporting event interferes with the program's usual scheduling. Topik Petang last aired on October 16, 2013.

External links
 an.tv

2000s Indonesian television series
2010s Indonesian television series
2006 Indonesian television series debuts
2013 Indonesian television series endings
Indonesian television news shows